Alexander Chazalet, born on 13 March 1972 Valence, Drôme is a retired French rugby union footballer, who played for the French national team, and mainly with the Bourgoin, who played as a third-line.

External links
  EspnScrum profile

1972 births
Living people
French rugby union players
France international rugby union players
Rugby union flankers
Sportspeople from Valence, Drôme
FC Grenoble players
CS Bourgoin-Jallieu players
Lyon OU players
SU Agen Lot-et-Garonne players